Talbingo Dam is a major ungated rock fill with clay core embankment dam with concrete chute spillway across the Tumut River upstream of Talbingo in the Snowy Mountains region of New South Wales, Australia. The impounded reservoir is called Talbingo Reservoir.

History
The structure was completed by Thiess Brothers in 1971, and is one of the sixteen major dams that comprise the Snowy Mountains Scheme, a vast hydroelectricity and irrigation complex constructed in south-east Australia between 1949 and 1974 that is now run by Snowy Hydro.

Location and features
The dam was constructed by Thiess Bros Pty Limited and, at the time, the project was the largest dam ever built in Australia. The dam is the largest and last of the sixteen dams completed as part of the Snowy Mountains Scheme.

The spillway is capable of discharging .

Power generation

The power station has  rated hydraulic head, which flows into the station from 6 large pressure pipes (one for each turbine) from a concrete inlet structure at the edge of the reservoir, built about midway between the proper Talbingo dam and its spillway. The inlet structure can be mistaken by tourists for being the main dam, due to being a far more conspicuous sight from the road that leads into the Talbingo Dam/Tumut 3 complex. The power generated at Tumut 3 serves both New South Wales and Victoria.

Recreation
The reservoir is a popular area for fishing; inclusive of Brown Trout, Rainbow Trout, Golden Perch, Macquarie Perch, Redfin, and Trout Cod. Power boating is permitted.

Camping is permitted in Kosciuszko National Park.

See also

 Hume and Hovell Track
 List of dams and reservoirs in New South Wales
 Snowy Hydro Limited
 Snowy Mountains Scheme

References

External links
 
 

Dams in New South Wales
Snowy Mountains Scheme
Dams completed in 1971
Embankment dams
Dams in the Murray River basin